Raffaele Biancolino (born 14 August 1977) is a former Italian footballer who played as a striker. He is currently the Under-19 chief youth coach of Avellino.

Playing career
Born in Naples, Biancolino played for lower league clubs well into his 20s. He only appeared for a Serie B side in the 2000–01 season, playing only three months for Ancona.

After returning to Serie C1, Biancolino joined Avellino in January 2003 and helped the side return to the second level. However, after being sparingly used in the start of the 2003–04 season, he moved to fellow second-divisioner Venezia in January 2004. Biancolino remained in the second and third levels in the following seasons, representing former side Avellino, Messina (being his side's topscorer in his only season at the club), Juve Stabia and Cosenza.

In July 2012, 34-year-old Biancolino joined Serie D side Salerno Calcio. After a sole season with the side (also being topscorer), he moved to Avellino, after refusing to play for Salernitana.

Coaching career
In March 2018, Biancolino joined Avellino's youth coaching staff as an assistant.

In September 2019, he was named new head coach of Promozione amateurs Carotenuto. He then served as head coach of Eccellenza amateurs Città di Avellino from April to May 2021.

In August 2021, Biancolino returned to Avellino as the assistant coach of Tonino Iandolo in charge of the Primavera Under-19 team. In July 2022 he was promoted in charge of the Under-19 team.

On 17 October 2022, Biancolino was named caretaker coach of Avellino, following the dismissal of head coach Roberto Taurino. He was in charge of the team for a single league game, a 0–2 loss to Viterbese, before being replaced by new permanent boss Massimo Rastelli.

References

External links

1977 births
Living people
Footballers from Naples
Association football forwards
Italian footballers
Italian football managers
Serie B players
Serie C players
Serie D players
A.C. Ancona players
Taranto F.C. 1927 players
U.S. Avellino 1912 players
Venezia F.C. players
A.C.R. Messina players
S.S. Juve Stabia players
Cosenza Calcio players
U.S. Salernitana 1919 players